Walpole Cross Keys is a village and civil parish in the English county of Norfolk.
For the purposes of local government, it falls within the district of King's Lynn and West Norfolk. Walpole Cross Keys' Primary School received a 'good' rating from Ofsted following a short inspection in 2019.

Notes 

Villages in Norfolk
Civil parishes in Norfolk
King's Lynn and West Norfolk